Alliance Atlantis Communications Inc. (commonly known as Alliance Atlantis and commonly shortened to simply Alliance or Atlantis and formerly traded as TSX:AAC) was a Canadian media company that operated primarily as a specialty service operator in Canada. Alliance Atlantis also had offices in Halifax, Los Angeles, London, Dublin, Madrid, Barcelona, Shannon, and Sydney.

Alliance Atlantis was a merger of two companies: Atlantis Communications, founded in 1978 by Michael MacMillan and Alliance Communications founded in 1985 by Robert Lantos and Victor Loewy with the company went public. Both Alliance Communications and Atlantis Communications merge to form Atlantis Alliance in 1998 and was  member of the North American Broadcasting Association (NABA).

The company ceased to exist in 2007 as the broadcasting division acquired by Canwest Global Communications and an affiliate of Goldman Sachs in 2007, with the motion picture division was then spun off and operated independently as Alliance Films, headquartered in Montreal (subsequently sold to Entertainment One), and the international television distribution division is now owned by Echo Bridge Entertainment.

All of the former Alliance Atlantis specialty networks, except for the now-defunct BBC Kids, are now owned by Corus Entertainment. The films division was later acquired by Entertainment One group and folded into eOne on January 9, 2013.

The Alliance name survived under the Alliance Cinemas banner until January 1, 2021, now owned by Cineplex Entertainment.

Formation and history
Alliance Atlantis was formed in 1998 from the merger of two former production companies, Alliance Communications (founded in 1985) and Atlantis Communications (founded in 1978). As President and Board Director of the subsequent combined Alliance Atlantis, Lewis Rose was responsible for leading the teams which arranged the merger financing of $545 million and which achieved in excess of $20 million in savings and synergies from the combination of the two companies in the year following the merger. (The merger was also parodied on Made in Canada, when that show's Pyramid Productions merged with a company called Prodigy.)

At the time of the merger, both companies had launched various Canadian specialty television services; in 1995, Alliance launched Showcase Television while Atlantis launched Life Network (which has since been renamed "Slice"); in fall 1997 the companies launched History Television and HGTV Canada respectively. Earlier that year, Alliance Atlantis teamed up with Hallmark Cards to create Crayola Kids Adventures, a series of three direct-to-video adaptations of well-known children's novels. Atlantis had also been a major investor in YTV in its first few years before selling out to what is now Corus Entertainment.

In 1998, the company purchased 75% of Cineplex Odeon Films. Also in 2000, it purchased the rights and interest of CSI: Crime Scene Investigation from Disney's Touchstone Television.

In 2001, the company purchased Salter Street Films, which produced a number of television shows for both the Canadian and international market. However, soon after the acquisition, Salter Street was disbanded and its active projects were transferred to Alliance Atlantis' own television production/development division.

Citing lower profits, Alliance Atlantis has all but closed its production arm, aside from the highly profitable CSI: Crime Scene Investigation family of series, which it co-produces with CBS Television Studios. It briefly maintained Salter Street's long-running This Hour Has 22 Minutes before transferring the show to the Halifax Film Company, made up of former Salter Street employees.

Its primary business became its ownership of a number of Canadian specialty services, which, in addition to those listed above, now include Food Network, Discovery Health (now FYI Canada), BBC Canada, BBC Kids and more.

In 2007, Alliance Atlantis was named one of Canada's Top 100 Employers, as published in Maclean's magazine, the only broadcaster to be included on the list.

Sale to CanWest / Goldman Sachs
On December 20, 2006, the company announced that it was "exploring strategic alternatives", effectively putting the company up for sale. Expected bidders included Canwest Global, Corus Entertainment, Astral Media, and Rogers Communications. The rights to CSI were expected to be sold separately, with CBS Paramount Television as the most likely bidder. A similar announcement was made previously regarding the Motion Picture Distribution unit, which is also expected to be sold separately while finding a bidder to acquire most parts of the company.

On January 10, 2007, it was announced that Alliance Atlantis would be acquired by a consortium of Canwest Global and GS Capital Partners, an affiliate of Goldman Sachs.

The Entertainment and Production division, consisting mainly of AAC's 50% stake in the lucrative CSI franchise, was acquired by GS Capital Partners. CBS Paramount TV gained Alliance Atlantis' international distribution rights to the programs.
Alliance Atlantis' international television distribution operations were sold by Goldman Sachs Capital Partners to Echo Bridge Entertainment.
Motion Picture Distribution LP, including its publicly traded income fund, was acquired by Canada-based EdgeStone Capital Partners and GS Capital Partners. On January 15, 2008, Edgemont's 51% voting stake (and 38.5% equity stake) in the Alliance label was purchased by Société générale de financement du Québec, an investment agency of the provincial government. Since the breakup, the company's films have been distributed under the "Alliance" banner for English-language releases and "Alliance Vivafilm" for French-language releases until the sale of the company to E-One
The Broadcasting division was jointly acquired by Canwest and GS Capital Partners, with the former owning a majority voting interest and the latter a majority of the equity. Canwest owns 66.67% and GS owns 33.32% of CW Media, the holding company for the former AAC channels.  Initially, Canwest still managed the channels it owned before the merger separately.  It was expected that the Canwest and CW Media broadcasting divisions would eventually be merged, potentially also giving GS a sizable interest in Global and other Canwest channels (these plans became moot after Canwest's creditor protection filings).

Ramifications
Following Canwest seeking creditor protection in late 2009, Shaw Communications subsequently took over most of Alliance Atlantis's former broadcasting assets as of October 27, 2010. after CRTC approval for the sale was announced on October 22. Alliance Atlantis (CW Media) became part of the Shaw Media division. Corus Entertainment acquired Shaw Media on April 1, 2016.

Entertainment One would later acquire Alliance Films on January 9, 2013 and all of their subsidiaries from Goldman Sachs Group, similar to the purchase of Maple Pictures a year prior. On November 20, 2014, Echo Bridge Entertainment sold Alliance Atlantis' children's programs, including the international distribution rights to the Degrassi franchise, to DHX Media while Sony Pictures Television holds syndication rights. eOne in turn was acquired by U.S. toy maker Hasbro in 2019.

Assets

Broadcasting 

Specialty Channels

 BBC Canada (80%) (now defunct)
 BBC Kids (80%) (now owned by Knowledge BC, now defunct)
 Discovery Health Canada (80%) (Now FYI Canada, now defunct)
 Fine Living Canada (80.24%) (later replaced by DIY Network Canada)
 Food Network Canada (57.58%)
 HGTV Canada (80.24%)
 History Television (now History Canada)
 IFC Canada
 National Geographic Channel Canada (80%)
 Showcase
 Showcase Action (now Action, later replaced by Adult Swim)
 Showcase Diva (now Lifetime Canada)
 Slice
 Historia (50%)
 One (37.77%) (now owned by ZoomerMedia)
 SCREAM (49%) (now defunct; last known as Dusk)
 Séries+ (50%)
 Score Media Inc. (25.93%)
 HARDtv (now Playmen TV)
 OutTV
 The Score (now Sportsnet 360)

Websites
 BlogTV (Now defunct, merged with YouNow)

NOTE: Channels marked in BOLD lettering indicates Alliance Atlantis was the managing partner.

Cinemas 

Alliance Atlantis owned a chain of cinemas called Alliance Cinemas (now known as Alliance Cinemas). The chain owned movie theatres in British Columbia and Ontario and is based in Toronto.

Entertainment
This division of Alliance Atlantis developed and distributed various television programmes to Canadian, American and International broadcasters. The programs ranged from series, lifestyle and documentaries. Some documentaries were produced through the AAC Fact unit. Children's programs were produced through the AAC Kids unit; most of the AAC Kids library (with some exceptions) is now owned by WildBrain. They include:

AAC Kids
 Max Glick (1990)
 The Adventures of the Black Stallion (1990-1992)
 Maniac Mansion (1990-1993)
 Kelly (1991)
 Wild Side Show (1992-1993)
 The Odyssey (1992-1995)
 White Fang (1993-1994)
 The Mighty Jungle (1994)
 Squawk Box (1994)
 ReBoot (1994–2001)
 Mirror, Mirror (1995)
 Flash Forward (1995-1997)
 Straight Up (1996-1998)
 Beast Wars: Transformers (1996–1999)
 Monster by Mistake (1996–2003)
 My Life as a Dog (1997)
 Crayola Kids Adventures (1997) (co-production with Hallmark Studios)
 Captain Star (1997-1998)
 Mirror, Mirror II (1997-1998)
 Mowgli: The New Adventures of the Jungle Book (1998)
 Legacy (1998-1999)
 The Famous Jett Jackson (1998-2001)
 Pumper Pups (1999)
 I Was a Sixth Grade Alien (1999-2001)
 Hoze Houndz (1999-2002)
 Yvon of the Yukon (1999–2005)
 In a Heartbeat (2000–2001)
 A Fish Tale (2000)
 Oscar Charlie (2001)
 Sail Away (2001–2007)
 Old Tom (2001-2002)
 Degrassi: The Next Generation (2001–2007)
 Ace Lightning (2002-2004)
 Connie the Cow (2003-2007)
 Henry's World (2003–2005)
 Mental Block (2004-2006)
 Peep and the Big Wide World (2004–2009)
 Poko (2004–2009)
 Dragon Booster (2004–2006)
 Instant Star (2004–2007)
 Lunar Jim (2006–2011)

Comedy and Drama Programs
 Airwaves (1985)
 The Ray Bradbury Theater (1985–1992)
 Mount Royal (1987)
 Bordertown (1989–1991)
 E.N.G. (1989–1994)
 Mom P.I. (1990–1991)
 Neon Rider (1990–1995)
 Counterstrike (1991–1993)
 African Skies (1991–1994)
 Destiny Ridge (1993–1994)
 This Hour Has 22 Minutes (1993–present) (Produced by Salter Street Films until 2003, now owned and produced by WildBrain)
 Due South (1994–1999)
 Mysterious Island (1995)
 Adventures of Sinbad (1996–1997)
 Psi Factor: Chronicles of the Paranormal (1996–2000)
 Fast Track (1997–1998)
 Night Man (1997–1999)
 Earth: Final Conflict (1997–2002)
 Welcome to Paradox (1998)
 Total Recall: 2070 (1998–1999)
 Power Play (1998–2000)
 Cold Squad (1998–2005)
 Da Vinci's Inquest (1998–2005)
 Little Men (1998–1999)
 Nothing Too Good for a Cowboy (1999–2000)
 Peter Benchley's Amazon (1999–2000)
 BeastMaster (1999–2002)
 Drop the Beat (2000–2001)
 Starhunter (2000–2004)
 2gether: The Series (2000)
 CSI: Crime Scene Investigation (2000–2015) (Now owned by CBS Television Studios)
 Trailer Park Boys (2001–present) (Distribution rights to TV and DVD, now distributed by Entertainment One worldwide)
 Haven (2001)
 The Associates (2001–2002)
 CSI: Miami (2002–2012) (Now owned by CBS Television Studios)
 The Eleventh Hour (2002–2005)
 CSI: NY (2004–2013) (Now owned by CBS Television Studios)
 Rent-a-Goalie (2006–2008)

Feature films
 Overdrawn at the Memory Bank (1984)
 Black Robe (1991)
 The Twist (1992)
 I Love a Man in Uniform (1993)
 Paris, France (1993)
 Family of Cops (1995)
 Crash (1996)
 The Sweet Hereafter (1997)
 Last Night (1998)
 Existenz (1999)
 The Five Senses (1999)
 Jesus' Son (1999)
 Something More (1999)
 Felicia's Journey (1999)
 Sunshine (1999)
 Stardom (2000)
 The Claim (2000)
 The 51st State (2001)
 Slackers (2002)
 Men with Brooms (2002)
 Bowling for Columbine (2002)
 Ararat (2002)
 The Good Thief (2002)
 Max (2002)
 Owning Mahowny (2003)
 Game Over: Kasparov and the Machine (2003)
 Foolproof (2003)
 My Life Without Me (2003)
 The Blue Butterfly (2004)
 Saint Ralph (2004)
 The Rocket (2005)
 Munich (2005) (Credit only, produced by Universal Pictures and DreamWorks)
 Bon Cop, Bad Cop (2006)
 Trailer Park Boys: The Movie (2006)
 Snow Cake (2006)
 It's a Boy Girl Thing (2006)
 Days of Darkness (2007)

Short films
 Boys and Girls (1983)

Alliance Films

Alliance Films was a major motion picture distribution/production company which serves Canada, the United Kingdom, and Spain. Formally known as Motion Picture Distribution LP, it was re branded and relaunched in 2007 due to the break-up of its preceding company, Alliance Atlantis, which was sold off piece by piece to Canwest Global, GS Capital Partners, along with several other smaller companies. Alliance Atlantis and Vivafilm home video releases were manufactured and distributed by NBCUniversal's Universal Pictures Home Entertainment.

Entertainment One (eOne) later acquired Alliance Films on January 9, 2013 for $225 million and merged Alliance Films and all of their subsidiaries under the Entertainment One brand.

References

External links
Alliance films
Alliance Vivafilm films (in French)
Alliance Atlantis International Distribution
Alliance Atlantis Cinemas
From Mini to Major, a book about the history of the company

 
Companies based in Toronto
Mass media companies disestablished in 2008
Defunct broadcasting companies of Canada
Entertainment One
Film production companies of Canada
Film distributors of Canada
Defunct film and television production companies of Canada
1998 establishments in Ontario
2008 disestablishments in Ontario
Former Corus Entertainment subsidiaries

fr:Alliance Atlantis